The Northern Michigan Wildcats men's ice hockey team is a National Collegiate Athletic Association (NCAA) Division I college ice hockey program that represents Northern Michigan University (NMU). The Wildcats are a member of the Central Collegiate Hockey Association (CCHA). NMU has won one national title and has made three Frozen Four appearances. They play at the Berry Events Center in Marquette, Michigan.

History

Early history
Under the Direction of NMU's president, John X. Jamrich, the initial ice hockey program was originally initiated by Seniors Gregory Hyde and Christopher Nolan in 1974. The NMU men's ice hockey program began in 1976, competing as an independent NCAA Division I team and probationary member of Central Collegiate Hockey Association (CCHA) for the 1976–77 season. During that season NMU competed against CCHA teams but did not count for league standings. Northern Michigan became a full member of the CCHA the following season.

In the first two season as a full member of the CCHA Northern Michigan finished with back-to-back 19 win seasons before a historic season in program history in 1979–80. During the 1979–80 season the team won its first CCHA regular season championship and CCHA Playoff Tournament championship. The Wildcats advanced to their first ever NCAA Tournament appearance and won their first game 4–3 against Minnesota. NMU advanced to the National Championship game with a semifinal win over Cornell 5–4. Northern Michigan finished as the runner-up to North Dakota. In addition to the tournament being the first tournament and National Championship appearance for Northern Michigan, it was also the highest NCAA Tournament finish for a CCHA team. NMU head coach Rick Comley became the first CCHA coach to receive the Spencer Penrose Award given to the NCAA Division I Men's Hockey Coach of the Year.

The success of the 1979–80 season continued for the 1980–81 season. The Wildcats again won the CCHA regular season and playoff championships and advanced to the NCAA Tournament. The Wildcats won the quarterfinal game against Cornell 10–7 but fell to Wisconsin 5–1.

WCHA years
On January 5, 1984, Northern Michigan announced the program was leaving the CCHA after seven seasons two league and playoff championships and two NCAA Tournament berths for the Western Collegiate Hockey Association (WCHA). The following day it was announced that rival Michigan Tech was also leaving the CCHA for WCHA. The 1988–89 season marked the first time NMU qualified for the NCAA Tournament as a member of the WCHA.  Unlike previous NCAA appearances Northern Michigan fell in the first round to Providence 5–4.

Northern Michigan qualified for the 1991 NCAA Tournament after winning the WCHA regular season championship. Northern Michigan won two games to none in the quarterfinal round against Alaska-Anchorage, 8–5 and 5–3. NMU advanced and beat Maine 5–3 in the semifinal round. The Wildcats matched up in the National Championship game in St. Paul, Minnesota on April 1, 1991, against Boston University and won 8–7 in three overtime periods. The 1990–91 season also set a program best record of 38–5–4 and a winning percentage of .851. It also marked the program's first and only NCAA Championship. The Wildcats returned to the National Tournament in 1992 NCAA Division I Men's Ice Hockey Tournament as the 4th seed of the West Regional held in Detroit, Michigan. NMU picked up a first round win over Clarkson 8–4 before losing in the quarterfinal round 7–6 to Michigan. The 1992–93 season marked the third straight NCAA Tournament appearance. NMU won a close game in the opening round of the 1993 Tournament in the East Regional in Worcester, Massachusetts, against Harvard. The Wildcats won a close game 3–2 in two overtime periods but fell 4–1 in the second round to Boston University in a rematch of the 1991 National Championship.

During the following seasons NMU remained competitive in the WCHA but by the mid-1990s the program fell into the bottom half of the standings. After six 20-plus win seasons from 1988 to 1989 season through the 1993–94 season, the Wildcats failed to reach 15 wins in their last three seasons in the WCHA. The 1995–96 season marked a program low record of 7–30–2. On August 19, 1996, the CCHA approved Northern Michigan's application to rejoin the league for the 1997–98 season after 13 years in the WCHA. During the years in the WCHA the Wildcats accumulated a record of 263–243–30.

Recent history

The return to the CCHA reinvigorated the program after several underachieving seasons and rebuilding years. In the 1996–97 season, the first back in the CCHA, the Wildcats finished with a record of 19–15–4. The season was the first winning record since the 1993–94 season. And in the following season NMU reached the NCAA National Tournament for the seventh time in program history. Northern Michigan entered the tournament as the 5th seed in the West Regional. Northern Michigan's playoff run was ended early by Boston College in a low scoring game 1–2.

On June 13, 2002, it was announced that Walt Kyle would take over as head coach for the Wildcats to become the second coach in program history. Rick Comley left to take over the head coaching position at Michigan State after 26 seasons behind the bench of the Wildcats. Kyle won his first game as head coach of Northern Michigan on October 5, 2002, against Upper Michigan rival Michigan Tech, 4–1. Kyle's first CCHA victory came on October 18, 2002, 10–4 against Rick Comley and his Michigan State team. Kyle led the Wildcats to four straight 20+ win seasons from 2002 to 2006 and six of his first eight seasons behind the NMU bench.

One of the most successful seasons in recent history came in the 2009–10 season. Northern Michigan finished the regular season ranked fourth in the CCHA and ranked 16th in the nation. The Wildcats received a first round bye in the CCHA tournament and matched up against Alaska Fairbanks, coming off first round sweep of Western Michigan. Northern Michigan swept the Nanooks two games to none with 4–3 and 5–1 victories, advancing NMU to the semifinal round. Northern Michigan took on Ferris State looking to overcome the semifinal losses the previous two seasons. The Wildcats came out on top of their seventh appearance in the CCHA Semifinals in the last eight seasons with an overtime goal by Greger Hanson to give Northern Michigan the 5–4 OT win. The win was the first time Northern Michigan advanced to the CCHA Championship game since 1999, under Rick Comley. The Wildcats run in the CCHA playoffs ended in the Championship game, when Northern Michigan fell short in a close game to Michigan. The Wildcats' 2–1 loss to the Wolverines did not end their season as NMU received an at-large bid to the 2010 NCAA Men's Division I Ice Hockey Tournament, their first tournament appearance since 1999 and first under Walt Kyle. Northern Michigan's first NCAA Tournament berth in 11 seasons took them to the West Regional at the Xcel Energy Center in St. Paul, Minnesota, and first round match-up against St. Cloud State. The Wildcats battled hard in front of a pro-SCSU crowd. Northern Michigan found themselves down early 2–0 in the first period but picked up a late goal by sophomore forward Justin Florek. St. Cloud answered in the second period on the power play but Northern Michigan kept within one goal when senior forward Ray Kaunisto scored late in the period. St. Cloud was held scoreless in the third while Northern Michigan tied the game with an even strength goal under four minutes left in the third period by junior defenseman Erik Spady. The Two team battled hard through the first overtime before St. Cloud State's Tony Mosey scored 23 seconds into the second overtime. Senior goaltender Brian Stewart stopped 50 SCSU shots in the tough loss.

In the summer of 2011, the Big Ten Conference announced intentions to begin sponsoring men's ice hockey in 2013, followed by Miami (OH) announcing the formation of the National Collegiate Hockey Conference for 2013 with and five other schools breaking from the WCHA. The realignment continued on July 20, 2011, when Northern Michigan was approved for membership in the WCHA beginning with the 2013–14 season.

In June 2019, it was announced that Northern Michigan was one of seven WCHA men's members that would leave to form a new conference after the 2020–21 season. Those schools later announced that they would reestablish the CCHA effective in 2021–22.

Season-by-season results

Source:

Historic record

Records vs. current CCHA teams
As of the completion of the 2020–21 season

Coaches
The Wildcats are currently coached by Grant Potulny, who assumed coaching duties after Walt Kyle's contract was not renewed in March 2017.

All-time coaching records
As of the completion of 2021–22 season

Statistical leaders
The team statistical leaders are given below.

Career points leaders

Career goaltending leaders

GP = Games played; Min = Minutes played; W = Wins; L = Losses; T = Ties; GA = Goals against; SO = Shutouts; SV% = Save percentage; GAA = Goals against average

minimum 1000 minutes played

Statistics current through the start of the 2019–20 season.

Players

Current roster
As of September 8, 2022.

Awards and honors

NCAA

Spencer Penrose Award
Rick Comley: 1980, 1991

NCAA Scoring Champion
Bill Joyce: 1980
Scott Beattie: 1991

Tournament Most Outstanding Player
Scott Beattie: 1991

AHCA First Team All-Americans

1980-81: Steve Bozek, F
1990-91: Brad Werenka, D; Scott Beattie, F
1991-92: Dallas Drake, F
2009-10: Mark Olver, D

AHCA Second Team All-Americans

1983-84: Bill Schafhauser, D
1986-87: Gary Emmons, F
1987-88: Phil Berger, F
1988-89: Darryl Olsen, D
1990-91: Bill Pye, G
1991-92: Jim Hiller, D
2004-05: Tuomas Tarkki, G
2005-06: Nathan Oystrick, D
2006-07: Mike Santorelli, F
2008-09: Erik Gustafsson, D
2009-10: Erik Gustafsson, D
2017-18: Philip Beaulieu, D
2018-19: Troy Loggins, F

WCHA

Individual awards

Player of the Year
Scott Beattie: 1991
Troy Loggins: 2019

Outstanding Student-Athlete of the Year
Brad Werenka: 1991

Defensive Player of the Year
Dallas Drake: 1992
Philip Beaulieu: 2019

Rookie of the Year
Scott Beattie: 1990
Tony Szabo: 1991

Coach of the Year
Rick Comley: 1989, 1991
Grant Potulny: 2018

Most Valuable Player in Tournament
Bill Pye: 1989, 1991
Corwin Saurdiff: 1992

All-conference teams
First Team All-WCHA

1985–86: Gary Emmons, F
1986–87: Gary Emmons, F
1987–88: Phil Berger, F
1988–89: Darryl Olsen, D
1990–91: Bill Pye, G; Brad Werenka, D; Scott Beattie, F
1991–92: Dallas Drake, F
1994–95: Greg Hadden, F
2017–18: Atte Tolvanen, G; Troy Loggins, F
2018–19: Atte Tolvanen, G; Philip Beaulieu, D; Troy Loggins, F

Second Team All-WCHA

1988–89: Phil Berger, F
1991–92: Jim Hiller, F
1992–93: Joe Frederick, F
1993–94: Mike Harding, F
2015–16: Darren Nowick, F; Dominik Shine, F
2016–17: Atte Tolvanen, G
2017–18: Philip Beaulieu, D; Adam Rockwood, F
2018–19: Adam Rockwood, F
2019–20: Philip Beaulieu, D; Griffin Loughran, F
2020–21: Joseph Nardi, F

Third Team All-WCHA

2014–15: Brock Maschmeyer, D
2016–17: Dominik Shine, F
2017–18: Darien Craighead, F; Robbie Payne, F
2019–20: Darien Craighead, F
2020–21: André Ghantous, F

WCHA All-Rookie Team

1990–91: Tony Szabo, F
1991–92: Corwin Saurdiff, G; Jason Helr, D
1993–94: Dean Seymour, F
1996–97: Buddy Smith, F
2015–16: Atte Tolvanen, G
2016–17: Darien Craighead, F
2019–20: John Hawthorne, G
2020–21: Rico DiMatteo, G

CCHA

Individual awards

Player of the Year
Don Waddell: 1978
Steve Weeks: 1980
Jeff Pyle: 1981
Tuomas Tarkki: 2005

Rookie of the Year
Jeff Poeschl: 1981
Gary Emmons: 1984
Chris Gobert: 2000

Coach of the Year
Rick Comley: 1980, 1981

Perani Cup
Craig Kowalski: 2004

Best Offensive Defenseman
Erik Gustafsson: 2009, 2010

Best Defensive Defenseman
Nathan Oystrick: 2005

Best Goaltender
Tuomas Tarkki: 2005

All-conference teams
First Team All-CCHA

1977–78: Don Waddell, D; Bill Joyce, F
1978–79: Tom Laidlaw, D
1979–80: Steve Weeks, G; Don Waddell, D; Tom Laidlaw, D; Steve Bozek, F; Bill Joyce, F
1980–81: Steve Bozek, F; Jeff Pyle, F
1999–00: Roger Trudeau, F
2004–05: Tuomas Tarkki, G; Nathan Oystrick, D
2005–06: Nathan Oystrick, D
2006–07: Mike Santorelli, F
2008-09: Erik Gustafsson, D
2009-10: Erik Gustafsson, D; Mark Olver, F
2011-12: Tyler Gron, F

Second Team All-CCHA

1978–79: Steve Weeks, G
1980–81: Jeff Poeschl, G
1998–99: J. P. Vigier, F
1999–00: Kevin Schmidt, D
2003–04: Nathan Oystrick, D
2011–12: Justin Florek, F
2021–22: AJ Vanderbeck, F

CCHA All-Rookie Team

1998–99: Chad Theuer, F
1999–00: Jimmy Jackson, D; Chris Gobert, F
2004–05: Mike Santorelli, F
2007–08: Erik Gustafsson, D; Mark Olver, F
2010–11: Kevin Kapalka, G
2021–22: Charlie Glockner, G

Northern Michigan Wildcats Hall of Fame
The following is a list of people associated with the Northern Michigan men's ice hockey program who were elected into the Northern Michigan Wildcats Hall of Fame (induction date in parenthesis).

Scott Beattie (2003)
Joe Blake (2002)
Steve Bozek (1991)
Rick Comley (1998)
Dallas Drake (2002)
Gary Emmons (1999)
Jim Hiller (2007)
Bill Joyce (1998)
Tom Laidlaw (1990)
Jay McQuillan (2017)
Mike Mielke (2009)
Darryl Plandowski (2014)
Bill Pye (2007)
Bill Schafhauser (2008)
Tuomas Tarkki (2013)
Don Waddell (1993)
Steve Weeks (1990)
Brad Werenka (2002)
1979–80 Hockey Team (2017)
1990–91 Hockey Team (1998)

Olympians
This is a list of Northern Michigan alumni who have played on an Olympic team.

Wildcats in the NHL
As of July 1, 2022.

Source:

Notable players
Dual US/French citizen Eric LeMarque went on to play for Team France at the 
1994 Winter Olympics, later losing his feet to frostbite in a mishap chronicled in autobiography and in the 2017 film 6 Below: Miracle on the Mountain.

Arena
The Wildcats play at the 3,902-seat Berry Events Center on the NMU campus in Marquette, Michigan. The arena has been the home of the Wildcats since 1999, replacing Lakeview Arena which had been the home to NMU hockey since the program began in 1976.

Pageantry

Puckheads
The Puckheads are a group of fans of the Wildcats hockey team, made up of students as well as community residents. In the words of a Michigan Daily feature article, "The Puckheads have created an atmosphere that makes the Berry Events Center one of the most entertaining and frustrating road trips for other teams in the CCHA."

The Puckheads were founded in November 1996 at Lakeview Arena. They travel and follow the team on many occasions, and have established rivalries with other teams' fan groups, notably the "Red Army" supporters of the Nebraska–Omaha Mavericks.

References

External links
Northern Michigan Wildcats men's ice hockey

 
Ice hockey teams in Michigan